The ATR 72 is a twin-engine turboprop, short-haul regional airliner developed and produced in France and Italy by aircraft manufacturer ATR ( or ), a joint venture formed by French aerospace company Aérospatiale (now Airbus) and Italian aviation conglomerate Aeritalia (now Leonardo S.p.A.). The number "72" in its name is derived from the aircraft's typical standard seating capacity of 72 passengers.

During the 1980s, French aerospace company Aérospatiale and Italian aviation conglomerate Aeritalia merged their work on a new generation of regional aircraft. A new jointly owned company, ATR, was established to develop, manufacture, and market their first airliner, which was later designated as the ATR 42. On 16 August 1984, the first model of the series, designated as the ATR 42-300, performed the type's maiden flight. During the mid-1980s, the ATR 72 was developed as a stretched variant of the ATR 42. On 27 October 1989, Finnish airline Finnair became the first airline to operate the type in revenue service. The ATR 72 has also been used as a corporate transport, cargo aircraft, and maritime patrol aircraft.

To date, all of the ATR series have been completed at the company's final assembly line in Toulouse, France; ATR benefits from sharing resources and technology with Airbus SE, which has continued to hold a 50% interest in the company. Successive models of the ATR 72 have been developed. Typical updates have included new avionics, such as a glass cockpit, and the adoption of newer engine versions to deliver enhanced performance, such as increased efficiency and reliability and reductions in operating costs. The aircraft share a high degree of commonality with the smaller ATR 42, which remains in production as of January 2023.

Development

Origins

During the mid-1980s, ATR sought to introduce a larger airliner with increased capacity over its earlier products. This new regional airliner, designated as the ATR 72, was directly developed from the earlier ATR 42 and had much in common with it; the principal difference between the two airliners was an increase in the maximum seating capacity from 48 to 78 passengers.

On 15 January 1986, the launch of the stretched ATR 72 programme was announced. On 27 October 1988, the first prototype performed its maiden flight. One year later, on September 25, 1989, the ATR 72 received airworthiness certification from the French Directorate General for Civil Aviation. During the following month, on 27 October 1989, Finnish airline Finnair became the first airline to introduce the aircraft into service. Since the ATR 72 is assembled on the same production line as the smaller ATR 42, along with sharing the majority of subsystems, components, and manufacturing techniques, the two types support each other to remain in production. This factor may have been crucial as, by 2015, the ATR 42 was the only 50-seat regional aircraft that was still being manufactured.

During 2000, the combined global ATR fleet reached its 10,000,000th flight, during which a distance around 4 billion km (2.5 billion statute miles) had been flown and around 450 million passengers had flown on board ATR-built aircraft. The 2007 production set a new record for the programme's sales; a total of 113 new ATR aircraft had been ordered during a single year. By the end of 2014, ATR had received 1,000 orders for the type and delivered a total of 754, leaving a backlog of 246 aircraft.

Within the ATR company, various organisational changes were implemented. On 10 July 1998, ATR launched its new Asset Management Department. In June 2001, EADS and Alenia Aeronautica, ATR's parent companies, decided to reinforce their partnership, regrouping all industrial activities related to regional airliners into the ATR consortium. On 3 October 2003, ATR became one of the first aircraft manufacturers to be certified under ISO 9001-2000 and EN/AS/JISQ 9100, the worldwide quality standard for the aeronautics industry. During July 2004, ATR and Brazilian aircraft manufacturer Embraer announced a co-operation agreement on the AEROChain Portal for the purpose of delivering improved customer service. During April 2009, ATR announced the launch of its 'Door-2-Door' service as a new option in its comprehensive customer services range.

Further development

As of October 2007, the current production version is the ATR 72-600 series. On 2 October 2007, ATR CEO Stéphane Mayer announced the launch of the -600 series aircraft; the ATR 42-600 and ATR 72-600 featured various improvements to increase efficiency, dispatch reliability, lower fuel burn and operating costs. While broadly similar to the earlier -500 model; differences include the adoption of improved PW127M engines, a new glass cockpit, and a variety of other minor improvements.

Since 2008, ATR has been a participant in the European Clean Sky Joint Technology Initiative. On 8 July 2015, an ATR 72-600 'green' technology demonstrator performed its first flight; the demonstrator was used for testing new composite materials for insulation, air conditioning systems, electrical distribution systems, and energy dispersal modifications to evaluate their effect on the aircraft's overall efficiency as a contribution to the Clean Sky initiative. ATR's senior vice-president for engineering Alessandro Amendola indicated that the elimination of all uses of bleed air was a key aim in the designing of an all-electric architecture as well as improving engine efficiency; the minimising of peak electrical loads was also a stated priority. During March 2016, a second round of flight trials dedicated the testing of all-electric systems architecture using the demonstrator was completed; analysis is set to continue.

As a consequence of strong demand for the -600 series, ATR decided to invest in the establishment of a second, more modern final assembly line and acquisition of more hangar space at its Toulouse site, along with a new large completion and delivery area; overall, the manufacturing operation expanded to four times the footprint that it had in 2005. Speaking in October 2015, ATR CEO Patrick de Castelbajac stated that the firm was set to produce in excess of 90 aircraft that year, and that the new manufacturing facilities could support a production rate of up to 120 per year. At the time, the company had a backlog of orders for 300 aircraft, sufficient for three years of production. During 2017, a new in-house financing and leasing division was established by ATR in order to offer customers a greater degree of support and expand the company's range of services.

Considerable emphasis has been placed upon the continuous development of ATR's aircraft models. Speaking at the Farnborough Airshow in July 2016, the CEO of ATR Patrick de Castelbajac stated that the company was currently examining the possibility of replacing the current Pratt & Whitney Canada PW127 engine with either a new offer from P&WC, or a GE38 derivative from GE Aviation. Although expressing satisfaction with the PW127 engine and its supplier, Castelbajac noted the design's age and the need to remain competitive with the latest regional jets. To be a worthwhile exercise, any re-engine exercise would require a 15 per cent improvement in fuel-burn and 20-25 per cent reduction of direct maintenance costs. Additionally, Castelbajac sees the potential re-engine as a "bridge" to the eventual development of a larger 100-seat aircraft.

During the mid-2010s, reports emerged that the development of a further stretched 90-seat ATR model was under consideration as well; allegedly, shareholder Airbus was relatively unenthusiastic on proceeding with such a development, while Airbus CEO Fabrice Brégier favoured a focus on resolving manufacturing issues. However, in January 2018, ATR's parent company Leonardo announced that the 100-seat program has been formally brought to a close.

Design

The ATR 72 is a turboprop-powered regional airliner, capable of accommodating a maximum of 78 passengers. It is powered by a pair of Pratt & Whitney Canada PW100 turboprop engines, which drive an arrangement of four or six-bladed propellers supplied by Hamilton Standard. It can land and takeoff in high airports with short runways like Andorra Airport. It employs carbonfibres for 30% of the wing by weight, for a 20% weight reduction.

In a standard configuration, the aircraft does not have an auxiliary power unit; when present it is installed within the C4 cargo section. Most operators of the ATR 72 equip their aircraft with a propeller brake (referred to as "Hotel Mode") that stops the propeller on the No. 2 (right) engine, allowing the turbine to continue running and provide both airflow and electrical power to the aircraft while on the ground.

In the majority of configurations, passengers board the ATR 72 using the rear door, a relatively unusual configuration for a passenger aircraft, while the front door is typically used for the loading and unloading of cargo; early customer Finnair intentionally ordered its ATR 72s with a front passenger door so that it could utilize the jet bridges at Helsinki Airport, while operator Air New Zealand's standard rear door aircraft can use jet bridges at airports with this equipment. While passengers are boarding or disembarking the aircraft, a tail stand is set into place as standard procedure to guard against the aircraft nose lifting off the ground.

Operational history

2011 was a record-breaking year for sales at ATR. According to ATR's CEO Filippo Bagnato, sales had continued to grow during the Great Recession despite the downturn experienced by most aviation companies as "fuel consumption that can be half that of the alternatives and [with] lower maintenance costs". Bagnato noted the strength of Africa as a market for the type, as well at the firm's aircraft being capable of serving destinations that would otherwise be inaccessible to other aircraft due to the austere conditions of many airstrips and runways in the region, as well as the ability to operate autonomously without any reliance upon ground support equipment.

For 2013, ATR claimed a 48 percent global market share for regional aircraft deliveries between 50 and 90 seats (comprising both turboprops and jets), making it the dominant manufacturer in this market segment. That same year, during which firm orders for 10 ATR 42-600s and 79 ATR 72-600s were recorded, leasing companies were responsible for 70 per cent of these; according to ATR's CEO Filippo Bagnato: "Years ago, we were not even considered by the lessors; now they see ATRs as a good investment". Several major leasing companies operate their own ATR fleets, such as Dubai Aerospace Enterprise (DAE), who placed an order for 20 ATR 72s along with options for another 20 in February 2014, and Nordic Aviation Capital (NAC), who ordered a fleet of 30 ATR 72s during June 2013, along with options for up to 55 further airliners. Placing their first order during 2011, by December 2012, Singaporean leasor Avation had a combined total of 20 ATR 72s on order; by February 2016, the number on order for  had risen to 35 aircraft.

During May 1997, ATR achieved their first breakthrough sale in China, placed by operator China Xinjiang Airlines and the Civil Aviation Administration of China (CAAC). By 2013, while the Asia Pacific region had comprised the majority of ATR's sales when geographically ranked; however, orders from Chinese airlines remained elusive; Bagnato ascribed this anomaly to local market conditions dictating the typical use of larger aircraft, as well as a Chinese government policy of imposing high tariffs on the import of foreign-built fixed-wing aircraft. During late 2014, ATR set up a new office in Beijing and hired several former Airbus sales personnel with the aim of launching the type in the Chinese market. ATR believed that many of the already-flown routes did not suit larger 150-seat aircraft; however, of the roughly 2,600 commercial aircraft flying in China at that time, only 68 had a capacity of less than 90 seats and of these, fewer than 20 were powered by turboprop engines.

In response to airlines often wanting to replace their early production ATR models with the latest generation ATR series, as well as to answer demand from cargo operators for the type, ATR has operated two separate dedicated freighter conversion programmes, known as the Bulk Freighter (tube version) and the ULD Freighter. Both conversions involve complete stripping of furnishings along with the addition of floor strengthening, new window plugs and 9g restraining nets, six additional longitudinal tracks for added flexibility, and an E-Class cabin; the ULD model can accommodate standard ULD-packaged cargo, such as LD3 containers or  pallets, which were loaded via a large cargo door located on the port forward side. Undertaken by a range of companies, such as Alenia subsidiary Aeronavali, Texas-based M7 Aerospace; French firms Indraéro Siren and Aeroconseil, Canadian Infinion Certification Engineering, and Spanish company Arrodisa, by October 2012, in excess of one-fifth of all first-generation ATR 42 and ATR 72 aircraft had already been converted to freighters.

Iran Air

During February 2016, ATR signed a deal with flag carrier Iran Air for a batch of 20 ATR 72-600s, along with options for 20 more aircraft and post-purchase services, such as engine maintenance. Made possible by a negotiated relaxation of international sanctions against Iran, during June 2017, a €1 billion Iranian contract was finalized for the firm 20 airliners and 20 options; the delivery of the first four aircraft occurred within weeks of the deal being completed. US sanctions against Iran were reimposed in August 2018, by which time 13 of the order of 20 aircraft had been delivered. In April 2019 the US Office of Foreign Assets Control (OFAC) issued a two-year licence to ATR to allow it to supply spare parts and other essentials to keep the fleet of 13 ATR 72-600s in operation. However, the remaining 7 ATR 72-600s from the 2016 order remain sanctioned and in storage.

Turkish Navy
While primarily used as a civil aircraft, some ATR 72s have been adapted to perform in various military functions, such as utility aircraft and maritime patrol aircraft (MPA). The Turkish Navy, which initially decided to purchase ten ATR 72-500 MPA, later changed its order to eight aircraft: Two ATR 72-600 TMUA (Turkish Maritime Utility Aircraft) versions, and six ATR 72-600 TMPA (Turkish Maritime Patrol Aircraft for MP/ASW/ASuW duties) versions. The armed ATR 72 TMPA variant was developed in cooperation with Turkish Aerospace Industries (TAI), and incorporated additional sensors and mission systems to perform its intended combat role. During 2013, the two ATR 72-600 TMUA aircraft were delivered to the Turkish Navy. The first ATR 72-600 TMPA was delivered in December 2020 and the second one in March 2021 was already in service with Turkish Navy. As of May 2021, 3 ATR 72-600 TMUA aircraft are being operated by the Turkish Navy.

Italian Air Force
The Italian Air Force selected the ATR 72-600 MP, designated as the P-72A, to serve as a multirole maritime patrol, electronic surveillance and C4 platform. The original Italian requirement for a Breguet Atlantic replacement had also called for ASW and anti-surface warfare (ASuW) capabilities, however, during 2014, the contract was renegotiated to a configuration that excluded these capabilities. An anticipated variant for ASW and ASuW operations may later be pursued; accordingly, provisions were made to allow for the four P-72As on order to be adapted to the ASW configuration. In December 2016, the first pair of P-72A aircraft were delivered to the Italian Air Force. The last aircraft was delivered to the Italian Air Force in February 2021.

Guardia di Finanza 
A single ATR 72 MP was ordered by Italy's paramilitary Guardia di Finanza (GdF) in July 2019, followed by an order for a further three ATR 72s in October 2019. The aircraft, called P-72B by Guardia di Finanza, will supplement the GdF's existing force of four ATR-42s in the border surveillance, maritime patrol and search and rescue roles.

FedEx Express
On 8 November 2017, FedEx Express launched the -600 cargo variant with 30 firm orders plus 20 options, in a freighter configuration from the factory.

As of September 2018, 187 early variants had been produced with 172 operated by 55 carriers, 365 -500s were delivered with more than 350 in service at 75 operators, 444 -600s were produced and are operated by 74 carriers with a backlog of  orders.
By then, with more than 60 -500s and 40 -600s in storage, new aircraft leases fell to $130,000 per month from $170,000.
The -600 list price of $26.8M is typically discounted by 25% for a $M value, a 2012 aircraft is valued $13.3M and leased $115,000, falling to $10.2M and $100,000 in 2021, a D check costs $0.5M and the engine overhaul costs $0.3-1.0M.

Failed bids

Germany
The ATR 72 was a candidate to replace the German Navy's P-3, at least as a stopgap solution from 2025 to 2032. But Germany ordered five P-8A Poseidon in 2021.

Variants

ATR 72-100
Two sub-types were marketed as the 100 series (-100).
ATR 72-101
Initial production variant with front and rear passenger doors, powered by two PW124B engines and certified in September 1989.
ATR 72-102
Initial production variant with a front cargo door and a rear passenger door, powered by two PW124B engines and certified in December 1989.

ATR 72-200

Two sub-types were marketed as the 200 series (-200).
ATR 72-201
Higher maximum take-off weight variant of the -101, a PW124B-powered variant certified in September 1989.

Higher maximum take-off weight variant of the -102, a PW124B-powered variant certified in December 1989.

ATR 72-210
Two sub-types were marketed as the 210 series (-210): the -211 (and with an enlarged cargo door, called the -212) is a -200 with PW127 engines producing  each for improved performance in hot and high-altitude conditions. The sub-types differ in the type of doors and emergency exits
ATR 72-211
PW127-powered variant certified in December 1992.
ATR 72-212
PW127-powered variant certified in December 1992.

ATR 72-212A 
Certified in January 1997 and fitted with either PW127F or PW127M engines, the -212A is an upgraded version of the -210 using six-bladed propellers on otherwise identical PW127F engines. Other improvements include higher maximum weights and superior performance, as well as greater automation of power management to ease pilot workload.

ATR 72-500
Initial marketing name for the ATR 72-212A.

Marketing name for ATR 72-212A with different equipment fit. The -600 series aircraft was announced in October 2007; the first deliveries were planned for the second half of 2010. The prototype ATR 72-600 first flew on 24 July 2009; it had been converted from an ATR 72-500.

The ATR 72-600 features several improvements. It is powered by the new PW127M engines, which enable a 5% increase in takeoff power via a "boost function" used only when called for by takeoff conditions. The flight deck features five wide LCD screens (improving on the EFIS of earlier versions). A multi-purpose computer (MPC) aims at increasing flight safety and operational capabilities, and new Thales-made avionics provide Required Navigation Performance (RNP) capabilities. It also features lighter seats and larger overhead baggage bins. In December 2015, the EASA approved a new high-density seating layout, raising the maximum capacity from 74 to 78 seats.
During the 2021 Dubai Airshow in mid-November 2021, ATR debuted the new ATR 72-600 engine which is powered by new PW127XT powerplants with 20% lower maintenance cost and 3% lower fuel consumption than the predecessor PW127M powerplant.

ATR 72MP 
The ATR 72MP is an ATR 72-600 derivative developed by Leonardo for search and rescue, maritime patrol, command and control, communication, computers, intelligence, surveillance and reconnaissance (C4ISR). 
Leonardo Electronics designed its Airborne Tactical Observation and Surveillance (ATOS) backbone to manage its sensors, combine their output in a tactical situation presented on up to four workstations.

The main sensors are
 a multimode radar, also with active electronically scanned array (AESA) like the Leonardo Electronics Seaspray 7300; 
 an electro-optical turret (EO/IR); 
 an automatic identification system (AIS); 
 an airborne search and rescue direction finder (ASARS DF).

A tactical display is added to the glass cockpit and can be integrated with INS/GPS positioning systems and IFF transponder. 
Three U/VHF radios, one HF radio and a wideband SATCOM are used for communications. Other sensors, systems and communications equipment can be integrated, like an electronic support measure (ESM) system. A defensive aids sub-system (DASS) is optionally available for operation in hostile areas.

Other versions

 Cargo
 Bulk Freighter (tube versions) and ULD Freighter (Large Cargo Door). ATR unveiled a large cargo door modification for all ATR 72 at Farnborough 2002, coupled with a dedicated cargo conversion. FedEx, DHL, and UPS all operate the type.

 -600F
 Purpose-Built freighter variant of the -600, 8 November 2017 launch with 30 firm orders from FedEx plus 20 options. The first flight of the variant took place on 16 September 2020; it was EASA certified by early December. In December 2020, FedEx Express received the first one of its order of 30, to be operated by ASL Airlines Ireland between Paris Charles de Gaulle and the Czech Republic. FedEx should receive six aircraft per year until 2025, later freighters will fly in the US and in Latin America. Compared to the passenger airliner, windows are removed, the floor is reinforced and a large front cargo door is added to load seven LD3 containers. ATR forecasts a market for 460 converted or new-build turboprop freighters over 20 years.

 ATR 72 ASW
 The ATR 72 ASW integrates the ATR 72 MP (Maritime Patrol) mission system with similar on-board equipment, but with additional anti-submarine warfare (ASW) capabilities. A variant of the -600 (itself a version of the maritime patrol model of the ATR 42-600) is also in production. For the ASW and ASuW missions, it is armed with lightweight aerial torpedoes. They are equipped with the Thales AMASCOS (Airborne Maritime Situation and Control System) surveillance system as well as electronic warfare and reconnaissance systems, enabling the type to perform maritime search and rescue duties.

 Corporate
 A VIP version of the -500 is available with a luxury interior for executive or corporate transport.

 ATR 82
 During the mid-1980s, the company investigated a 78-seat derivative of the ATR 72. The ATR-82 project (as it was dubbed) was suspended when  was formed in early 1996.

 ATR 82 TF
 ATR also studied a turbofan version of the proposed ATR 82 (stretched version of the ATR 72) in the early 1990s.

 ATR Quick Change
 This proposed version targeted the increasing demand of worldwide cargo and express mail markets, where the aim is to allow operators to supplement their passengers flights with freighter flights. In Quick Change configuration, the smoke detector is equipped alongside other modifications required in order to meet the certification for full freight operations. The aircraft was equipped with a larger cargo door (1.27 m [50 in] wide and 1.52 m [60 in] high) and low door-sill height of an average 1.2 m (4 ft), facilitating containerised freight loading. It takes 30 minutes to convert the aircraft on ATR 42, while for ATR 72, it takes 45 minutes. Each optimized container has  of usable volume and maximum payload is 435 kg (960 lb).

Major operators

Civilian operations

See List of ATR 72 operators. Primary ATR 72 airline operators (with 15 aircraft or more) were:

Military operators

 Italian Air Force
 Guardia di Finanza

 Pakistan Navy

 Turkish Navy

Accidents and incidents

The ATR 72 has been involved in 66 aviation accidents and incidents, including 40 hull losses,
resulting in  fatalities. As of January 2023, there have been 12 accidents with at least one fatality reported. The most recent fatal accident was Yeti Airlines Flight 691, which also is the deadliest ATR 72 accident with 72 casualties.

Specifications (ATR 72-600)

See also

References

Citations

External links

 
 
 

072
Cargo aircraft
1980s international airliners
France–Italy relations
High-wing aircraft
T-tail aircraft
Aircraft first flown in 1988
Twin-turboprop tractor aircraft